Ye Soo-jung (born on 25 March 1955) is a South Korean actress. She is known for her roles in dramas such as Mine, The King of Tears, Lee Bang-won, One the Woman, Link: Eat, Love, Kill, Do You Like Brahms? and Becoming Witch. She also appeared in movies Tunnel, Sea Fog, The Client, Train to Busan and Along with the Gods: The Two Worlds.

In 1979, she made her debut in the play A Woman Named Solitude and she presented a well-balanced and solid performance with her solid interpretive skills and broad perspectives that she developed while studying abroad in Germany. Her play performances includes Long Day's Journey into Night, Gift of Gorgon, The Cherry Orchard, Widows, Green Bench, Guest, Hanako, Death of a Salesman. She was called  playwright called the godmother of the theater world.

Early life and education 
Ye Soo-jung was born as Kim Soo-jeong on March 1955 in Jongno, Seoul, South Korea. Ye attended Susong Elementary School, Soongui Girls’ Middle School and High School. In 1973, she enrolled in Departement of German Literature of Korea National University of Arts.

Career 
When studying from Korea National University of Arts with a degree in German Literature, She watched film The Godfather and extremely impressed by Marlon Brando's acting which made her want to try acting too. After that, Ye joined a theater class at the German Cultural Center Above the Theater and started acting secretly.Later she encounter works of German playwright Bertolt Brecht. Knowing Brecht's words, "Theater is a space for civic enlightenment," Jung thought, "Oh, it's really wonderful to live here (theater) all my life." 

In 1975, Ye acted in Arthur Miller's play Broken Glass (play). Followed by Henrik Ibsen's play Ghosts produced by Korea University Theatre Arts Research Society (고려대학교 극예술연구회).

After graduating from university, she worked as a German tutor and editor-in-chief of the Full Gospel Church magazine to earn pocket money while acting in plays. Ye debuted professionally onstage in 1979 with Han Tae-suk's play A Woman Named Solitude. After watching play A Woman Named Solitude,  (director, former chairman of the Seoul Institute of the Arts) scouted her for his work When Spring Comes to the Mountains and Fields. One day, Yoo noticed that Ye, who participated in his practice, was acting without her mother's  permission. "You can't do that," he said and Yoo went to her house and to ask Jeong personally, Jeong said to her, "Do it with a guarantee."

After this play Ye got married and went to Germany with her husband. In 1984, Ye decided to study theater in Graduate School Ludwig Maximilian University of Munich. After she’s back to South Korea, Ye worked in Customer Call Center for two years.

Ye only active in films since 2003. She’s done minor and supporting roles mostly as mother. Most notable supporting role was in film Along with the Gods: The Two Worlds, which was released in 2017. She reprised her role in the sequel Along with the Gods: The Last 49 Days.

Her most notable role was in Lim Seon-a's film , as 69-year-old Hyo-jeong. She is sexually assaulted by a 29-year-old male nurse while receiving treatment at a hospital. She reports it to the police, but faces society's prejudice because she is an elderly person! a dementia patient. The court, considers the elderly woman to be asexual and dismisses the arrest warrant, saying that there is insufficient probability that a young man would do such a thing. With this role Ye gained critical acclaim, She was nominated for several Best Actress award and won the 21st 'Female Filmmaker of the Year' for this film.

Personal life 
Soo-jung is the daughter of  who was a popular actress of 50s, 60s and 70s. She is the sister-in-law of actor Han Jin-hee who has married her sister Kim Soo-ok.

Ye married Kim Chang-hwa in 1980 after completing the play When Spring Comes to the Mountains and Fields. Ye gave birth to a daughter (currently an actress and theater director Kim Ye-na) in 1982 and left to study at Munich University in Germany with her husband in 1984. In 1986 a son was born. During their 8-year stay in Germany, her husband received a doctorate in theater theory and Ye completed a master's degree in theater theory. They returned in 1991.

Filmography

Film

Television series

Stage

Student Stage

Professional Stage

Awards and nominations

Notes

References

External links 
 
 

1955 births
20th-century South Korean actresses
Living people
21st-century South Korean actresses
South Korean television actresses
South Korean film actresses